Sir Thomas Mackworth, 3rd Baronet (1 May 1624 – 28 November 1694) was an English politician.

Mackworth was the son of Sir Henry Mackworth, 2nd Baronet of Normanton Hall and Mary Hopton, daughter of Robert Hopton. In 1640, he inherited his father's baronetcy. He was a Royalist during the English Civil War; he was fined as a delinquent in March 1648. Mackworth served as High Sheriff of Rutland from 1666 to 1667.

In 1679, Mackworth was elected as a Member of Parliament for Rutland. He was returned for the seat again in 1680, 1685 and 1689. In Parliament, he opposed James II's religious policy and as a result he was excluded from the lieutenancy of Rutland in 1688. He was included on a blacklist of Convention Parliament MPs compiled by Anthony Rowe after rejecting the notion that James II had abdicated during the Glorious Revolution. However, during the 2nd Parliament of William III and Mary II, Mackworth was classed as a Whig by the Marquess of Carmarthen. On 6 February 1692 he was granted leave of absence for reasons of ill-health, and he died of smallpox in 1694.

References

1624 births
1694 deaths
Baronets in the Baronetage of England
Cavaliers
English MPs 1679
English MPs 1680–1681
English MPs 1685–1687
English MPs 1689–1690
English MPs 1690–1695
High Sheriffs of Rutland
Whig members of the pre-1707 English Parliament